Sabina Selimovic (c. 16 February 1999 – ????), and Samra Kesinovic (c. 25 September 1997 – ????), were two teenaged Austrian nationals who at the height of the ascendancy of the Islamic State of Iraq and the Levant militia's conquests in the Middle East in April 2014, abandoned their family homes in Central Europe and illicitly travelled to Syria to join it. Their actions drew substantial media commentary due to the ongoing media reports of en masse barbarity that the Islamic State forces were engaging in, and raised questions as to why people of European extraction would be drawn to such an entity.

Background
Selimovic and Kesinovic were born in Austria to Bosniak immigrants who had fled the Bosnian War in the 1990s. Both girls were residents with their families in stable homes in Vienna, and are believed to have become interested in the Islamic State after watching its broadcast propaganda on the Internet, and through their attendance at a mosque in Vienna.

Departure to join the Islamic State
In April 2014, the pair left their homes in Vienna illicitly, without telling their families of their intentions, leaving a note for their parents stating: "Don't look for us. We will serve Allah and we will die for him." They then traveled via Turkey to Syria, entering it through its Northern border, wherein they entered Islamic State controlled territory. The pair later posted photographs from Islamic State territory on social media websites for Jihadist propaganda, wearing burqas and brandishing machine guns. 

Information obtained by the French news magazine Paris Match shortly afterwards disclosed that the two girls had been married to two Chechen Jihadists, and that they had expressed fears of imprisonment back in Austria for their activities on social media as Islamic State propagandists should they return home.

Purported deaths
Selimovic and Kesinovic were subsequently reported to be seeking a means of returning to Austria only six months later, around October 2014, though other media reports stated that Selimovic had been killed around September 2014 at the age of 16 during fighting in Syria. 

In late 2015, it was reported by the Middle East bureau of The Daily Telegraph newspaper that Kesinovic had been beaten to death with a hammer towards the end of 2014, after being caught by Islamic State forces whilst trying to escape from sex slavery in the city of Raqqa. She was 17 years old. Reports in 2019 reiterated that the girls were dead. That same year, Sabina Selimovic's children were sent to Austria from the Al-Hawl refugee camp and taken into custody of Sabina's mother after a DNA test confirmed their kinship.

See also
List of people who disappeared

References

1990s births
2010s missing person cases
2014 deaths
2015 in Austria
Austrian children
Austrian Islamists
Austrian Muslims
Austrian people of Bosnia and Herzegovina descent
Austrian people of Bosniak descent
duos
Female murder victims
Islamic State of Iraq and the Levant members
Missing person cases in Syria
People from Vienna
People killed in the Syrian civil war
People murdered in Syria
History of women in Syria
Violence against women in Syria